Stebėkiai is a village in Panevėžys District Municipality, Lithuania. According to the 2011 census, it had no residents.

Prominent Polish-Lithuanian painter Kanuty Rusiecki was born here.

References

Villages in Panevėžys County